The following is a List of Cotabato provincial symbols. Most symbols were designated by the virtue of Provincial Ordinance No. 540 which took effect on September 1, 1914.

Provincial symbols

References

Symbols
Cotabato